Ramco Institute of Technology (RIT), is an Engineering college in Rajapalayam, approved by AICTE and affiliated to Anna University, Chennai.

Department & Courses Offered 
RIT has the following five departments:

Civil Engineering
 Computer Science & Engineering
 Electrical & Electronics Engineering
 Electronics & Communications Engineering
 Mechanical Engineering
 Computer Science and Business System

References 

Official website

Engineering colleges in Tamil Nadu
Education in Virudhunagar district